Chris O'Connor (born May 7, 1965) is a vocalist, guitarist, and bassist. His first band, The I-Rails, was formed with high school buddy, guitarist/songwriter Jeff Sparks in 1986. Together with drummer Tim Lauterio, The I-Rails made four albums in the course of a few  years from the late 1980s up to 1991, none of which received much attention. The band officially broke up in 1991.

Using material he and Sparks wrote for a planned fifth I-Rails album, O'Connor made the Rocket album entirely on his own on a broken-down 1969 Ampex 16-track tape deck and a budget of $1,000 and called himself Primitive Radio Gods, which is what would have been the band's last album title. The album wouldn't be released for four years however when it was picked up by Columbia Records, Germany. It was soon released with only minimal remixing and the single, "Standing Outside a Broken Phone Booth with Money in My Hand" shot up the charts and was featured in Jim Carrey's movie The Cable Guy. O'Connor reunited with The I-Rails under the new name.

The band released a second album, White Hot Peach in late 2000 under a small independent label What Are Records?, and then a third album, minus Sparks, called Still Electric in 2003.

Primitive Radio Gods released their fourth full-length album, Sweet Venus, on May 4, 2006. Currently the album is only available as a download on their website. Whether or not a physical copy of the album will be produced or distributed remains to be seen.

Some biographical information can be found on this page of Primitive Radio Gods' official site.

References 

1965 births
Living people
American rock guitarists
American male bass guitarists
American rock bass guitarists
American rock singers
American male singers
Place of birth missing (living people)
20th-century American bass guitarists
20th-century American male musicians